Russian Railways is a Russian fully state-owned vertically integrated railway company, both managing infrastructure and operating freight and passenger train services.

RZhD is based in Moscow at Novaya Basmannaya str., 2. The operating units of the central part of the staff are at Kalanchevskaya str., 35.

Railways in the autonomous region of Crimea are controlled by Crimea Railway, a separate company.

History

Background and 2003 reform

After the collapse of the Soviet Union in 1991, the Russian Federation inherited 17 of the 32 regions of the former Soviet Railways (SZD).

In the mid-1990s, the profitability of railway transportation of the Russian Ministry of Railways fell to negative values, the bureaucratization of the ministry itself was publicly criticized, which became an occasion for reforms. Shortly after being elected president of Russia in 2000, Vladimir Putin approved the idea of reforming the railway transport, according to which all economic functions on the railway should be transferred to a joint-stock company with 100% state participation. The start of the state program for reforming the Russian railway sector was given by the establishment of Russian Railways in October 2003. The new company received over 95% of the assets belonging to the Ministry of Railways of the Russian Federation.

In 2003, the Federal Law on Railway Transport divided the Ministry of Railways into the Federal Railway Transport Agency (FRTA) and Russian Railways (RZD). The reform also required RZD to provide access to railway infrastructure to other carriers and operators. As the law requires carriers to provide service to customers anywhere in Russia, RZD retained its dominant position.

Later in 2003, the Decree No. 585 established RZD as a joint stock company, making it a holding in charge of 63 subsidiaries, including TransContainer, RailTranAuto, Rail Passenger Directorate, Russian Troika, TransGroup, and Refservis. RZD acquired 987 companies (95% in asset value) out of the 2046 that had formed the MR system. Gennady Fadeyev, the Railways Minister, became the company's first president.

The reform saw the creation of a new market segment following the privatization of the network's rolling stock. The company divided the bulk of its wagon fleet between two new operating companies, Freight One (which was later privatised) and Freight Two (renamed Federal Freight in 2012), and private players such as GlobalTrans also entering the market.

2000s

In 2003, RZD launched a project to replace the narrow gauge on Sakhalin Railway to the broad gauge used in the rest of Russia, which it formally completed in August 2019. The share of privately owned wagons in the freight transport increased to one-third of the total by 2005. On 18 May 2006, the company signed an agreement with Siemens for the delivery of eight high-speed trains.

On 23 May 2007, Russian Railways adopted a new corporate style which changed fundamentally the way the Company presented itself visually to the outside world. The change of corporate identity underwent several stages during the 2007–2010 period. The final version of the logo was designed by BBDO Branding.

Also, commissioned by BBDO Branding The Agency HardCase Design created a family of corporate fonts RussianRail, consisting of 15 fonts. In the new company logo Sans-serif RussianRail Grotesque Medium was used. In 2008, the new logo of Russian Railways became a runner-up for the international design competition WOLDA '08 award.

Strategy 2030, an investment plan to expand and modernize the railway network, was approved by the Russian government in 2008. Since 2008, as part of the structural reform of rail transport, with separation of the services infrastructure of transportation activity and the emergence of a competitive environment, Russian Railways has been transformed into a vertically oriented holding company.

In 2009, the investment budget was 262.8 billion rubles (excluding VAT), of which 47.4 billion for projects related to the preparation and staging of the Olympic Games in Sochi; 58.7 billion for the renovation of the rolling stock (including supply of Sapsan trains).

2010s

In 2010, Federal Passenger Company was established as a fully owned subsidiary of Russian Railways, providing long-distance passenger services both in Russia and abroad. By the end of 2013, it operated all long-distance routes, except for high-speed Sapsan lines, which are operated by RZD.

RZD issued its first dollar-denominated bond in 2010, raising $1.5 billion. On 28 October 2011, the Joint Stock Company Freight One, a subsidiary of Russian Railways, sold 75% of its shares minus two shares for 125.5 billion rubles (about 4 billion $) to Independent Transport Company owned by Vladimir Lisin. Thus, Lisin as Russia's largest operator of rolling stock acquired control of a quarter of the freight market.

As part of its reform efforts, RZD massively reduced its workforce, from 2.2 million in the 1990s to 934,000 people in 2012. In 2012, it became one of the three largest transport companies in the world.

According to a Reuters inquiry, RZD procurement activities in 2012 amounted to $22.5 billion; part of this was awarded to private contractors with no genuine operations in de facto noncompetitive tenders. Some of the company addresses listed on the tenders turned out to be private apartments, car repair shops or department stores. It was alleged that the contractors were actually shell companies, used to convey billions of dollars in tenders to close associates of Yakunin, president of RZD.

Zheldoripoteka, RZD's real estate arm, was revealed to have sold land plots located close to railway stations in major cities to the son of Russian Railways president Vladimir Yakunin. Far East Land Bridge, a company partnered with a Russian Railways subsidiary, was also linked to Yakunin's son.

On 16 October 2012, Russian Railways has completed competitive negotiations with potential buyers of the remaining 25-percent plus 1 share stake in JSC Freight One. The best binding offer was received from the Independent Transport Company LLC. The assets were sold for 50 billion rubles.

In early November 2012, Russian Railways announced the purchase of 75% of the French logistics company Gefco SA. The total value of the transaction was 800 million euros, the seller being PSA Peugeot Citroen, the parent company of Gefco. A program to modernize the Baikal–Amur Mainline was launched in 2013, costing the equivalent of £4 billion by 2018.

In 2015, RZD International won a  €1.2 billion contract to electrify the Garmsar–Inche Bourun line in Iran.

In August 2015, company president Vladimir Yakunin was dismissed, allegedly because of poor performance and mismanagement. Yakunin was replaced by Oleg Belozyorov.

RZD International began works on the reconstruction of the Serbian Vinarci – Djordjevo line in 2016. The Moscow Central Circle railway, designed and managed by Roszheldorproject, an RZD subsidiary, opened in September 2016. In July 2018, the company announced plans to phase out third-class carriages on long-distance trains by 2025.

2020s
On 24 February 2022, in response to Russia's invasion of Ukraine, US President Joe Biden announced economic sanctions against several Russian companies, including Russian Railways.

On 8 April 2022, the shipping company CMA CGM announced to be acquiring the French logistics company Gefco SA from Russian Railways and minority shareholder Stellantis.

On 11 April 2022, the Wall Street Journal and Reuters reported that the International Swaps and Derivatives Association had determined a "failure to pay" credit event occurred on 250 million CHF worth of Swiss franc loan participation notes linked to an entity related to Russian Railways, RZD Capital. The determination is considered the first step to triggering a credit default swap.

Future projects

Planned projects
In March 2016, RZD approved an updated version of high-speed rail development program until 2030. The 5 trillion ruble program includes the construction of Moscow–Kazan–Yekaterinburg, Moscow–Adler and Moscow–Saint Petersburg high-speed lines, as well as other high-speed lines connecting regional cities.

The construction program is divided into three stages. Until 2020 Russian Railways plans to put into operation the high-speed rail sections linking Moscow–Kazan (1.2 trillion rubles), Moscow–Tula (268.6 billion rubles), Chelyabinsk–Yekaterinburg (122.6 billion rubles), Tula–Belgorod (86.8 billion rubles), Yekaterinburg–Nizhny Tagil (12.9 billion rubles) and Novosibirsk–Barnaul (62.3 billion rubles).  The project design of the largest container port in Ust-Luga for reception and distribution of containerized freight on China–Europe route is also part of the program.

Between 2021 and 2025 RZD plans to build Rostov–Krasnodar–Adler, Tula–Voronezh high-speed rail and the extension of Kazan-Yelabuga high-speed rail, as well as other regional high-speed rail links.

During the 2026–2030 third phase of the program, Russian Railways will build Moscow–Saint Petersburg high-speed rail section; the railway line will be extended from Yelabuga to Yekaterinburg, and from Voronezh to Rostov-on-Don.

Proposed projects
In March 2015, at a meeting of the Russian Academy of Science, Vladimir Yakunin presented an ambitious new transport route called the Trans-Eurasian Belt Development (TEPR) which would go "through Russia with a mega road and high-speed rail network to link Asia with Europe' and with the opportunity to go to Chukotka and Bering Strait and then to the American continent" to Alaska, "making overland trips from Britain to the US (via the Channel Tunnel) a possibility."

Owners and management

The Russian Federation is the founder and sole shareholder of JSC Russian Railways. On behalf of its shareholders the powers are exercised by the Government of the Russian Federation. It approves the president of the company, forms the board of directors annually and approves the annual reports.

An IPO for the company was considered in 2012, but it was pushed back to after 2020.

The Chairman of the Board of Directors of JSC Russian Railways is Oleg Belozerov. Before him, the position was occupied by Kirill Androsov from September 2011 till June 2015., and previously by Alexander Zhukov – from 20 July 2004 to September 2011 and Viktor Khristenko – from 16 October 2003 – 20 July 2004.

Gennady Fadeev was President of JSC Russian Railways from 23 September 2003 – 14 June 2005. He was succeeded by Vladimir Yakunin – from 14 June 2005 to 20 August 2015. Oleg Belozyorov has been president of the company since 20 August 2015.

Subsidiaries
As of December 2013, Russian Railways has controlling interests in the following companies:

 Federal Passenger Company (100%);
 Gefco S.A. (75%);
 Federal Freight (100%);
 TransContainer (50.6%);
 Refservice (100%);
 RailTransAuto (51%);
 High-speed Rail Lines (100%);
 RZDstroy (100%);
 Roszheldorproject (55.56%);
 RZD Trading Company (50% + 1)
 TransTeleCom (100%);
 Zhilsotsipoteka (100%);
 Zheldoripoteka (100%);
 TransWoodService (100%);
 BetElTrans (100%);
 First Nonmetallic Company (100%);
 Zeleznodorozhnaya Torgovaya Kompaniya (100%);
 Wagon Repair Company – 1 (100%);
 Wagon Repair Company – 2 (100%);
 Wagon Repair Company – 3 (100%);
 Kaluga Plant Remputmash (100%);
 Incorporated Electrotechnical Plants (50 + 1).

Activities

The main activities of Russian Railways involve freight and passenger traffic. In Russia, railways carry 42% of the total cargo traffic, and about 33% of passenger traffic. Some passenger categories, such as pensioners, members of parliament, and holders of Soviet and Russian state decorations, receive free or subsidized tickets.

Freight traffic
In 2013 railways carried nearly 90% of Russia's freight, excluding pipelines. In 2014, railway infrastructure and locomotive services accounted for 74% of the company's total revenue.

The cost of freight tariff is determined by the Federal Tariff Service at net cost or higher.

Long-distance travel
Russian Railways has a near-monopoly on long-distance train travel, with its subsidiary, Federal Passenger Company, accounting for 90% of total passenger turnover in 2017. Passenger transportation accounted for 10.6% of the company's revenue in 2017. The long-distance passenger fleet includes 19,386 rail cars as of 2017, with an average age of 19.1 years. Over 60% of long-distance passengers travel in third-class sleeping carriages.

The long-distance rail passenger business is under increasing competition from airlines, due to their aggressive domestic pricing policies and generally shorter travel times for routes under 1,000 km. International rail passenger traffic dropped from 19.4 million passengers in 2013 to 6.8 million in 2017.

In 2005–2010, JSC Russian Railways has launched a program to introduce new high-speed trains. The first train, Sapsan, commenced service in December 2009 and connects Saint Petersburg, Moscow and Nizhny Novgorod and is operated with trains manufactured by the German company Siemens.

The second train, Allegro, has run from Saint Petersburg to Helsinki via Vyborg since December 2010 and is owned and operated together with the Finnish VR Group.

Sapsan was the most successful passenger train of JSC Russian Railways with occupancy rate of 84.5% (according to RZD in 2010) and profitability of 30% (although capital costs were not included in its calculation).

Fares on long distance trains

Passenger tariffs (except for travelling in the stateroom, sleeping and VIP-cars) are approved by the State, represented by the Federal Tariff Service with social orientation of its traffic operations below cost. Passenger fare is divided into two components: «ticket» (which includes the cost of transport infrastructure, locomotive traction and the Station component) and «reserved seat» (service of transport company, which is the owner of the car). Since 2003, the flexible schedule tariffs (FST) to travel on long-distance trains is used:
in the period of keen demand the rate is above the annual average by 5–20% (earlier it was up to +45%)
approximately the third part of the year the base rate is active
during the periods of low passenger's traffic the rate is lower by 5–20%. On certain days of the year (from 1 to 3 days, at different times on such days as 31.12, 01.01 and dates around 9 May) the index of 45–50% is valid when tickets are twice cheaper.
FST is calculated in such a way as to stimulate passengers to undertake a trip on the date with the lowest index. In 2010 and 2011, the average weighted index for calendar periods was 0.97 and the average volume of passenger traffic – 1.00.
According to the JSC Russian Railways statement, the passenger transportation – except for some highly profitable directions – is unprofitable. These losses are partly compensated from the budget, and for the most part – with the help of cross-subsidies by income from freight.

Suburban passenger companies

Since 2009, the company is not a direct carrier of suburban passengers. Suburban transport is now operated by passenger companies founded by the executive agencies of the Russian Federation, Russian Railways and private investors. As of 2016, there are 25 suburban passenger companies (SPC), and Russian Railways owns a majority stake in 19 of them.

Especially for the SPC a zero tariff for the use of railway infrastructure was introduced. Russian Railways receives 25 billion rubles subsidies as compensation annually from the State. Commuter traffic in the whole network increased in 2011 on 5.6% and is about 878.33 million people. Passenger turnover rail in the Russian regions ranges from 5% to 30% in total passenger traffic.

Sponsorship
Since its establishment in 2003, Russian Railways sponsoring FC Lokomotiv Moscow in the Russian Premier League.

Since February 2016 Russian Railways is the sponsor of Rodina Kirov, a bandy team in the Russian Bandy Super League.

Assets

Infrastructure

As of 31 December 2009, the total operational length of railway is 85 281 km, including the track gauge of  – 84 446 km, the length of continuous welded rails 74.4 thousand km, the railway network operated by 166 975 switches, 138 tunnels and 30,727 bridges.

The length of lines equipped with automatic block (AB) and centralized control, is 62,055 km, or 72.9%. Devices of railway automation and remote control on the Russian railway network served with 203 distance signaling, centralization and blocking and with one technical center of automation and remote control.

The following Railways belong to RZD:

:
 October Railway – 10,378 km (managed from Saint Petersburg)
 Kaliningrad Railways – 963 km (managed from Kaliningrad)
 Moscow Railway – 8,800 km (managed from Moscow)
 Gorky Railway – 5,297 km (managed from Nizhny Novgorod)
 Northern Railway – 5,961 km (managed from Yaroslavl)
 North Caucasus Railways – 6,311 km (managed from Rostov-on-Don)
 South-Eastern Railway – 4,189 km (managed from Voronezh)
 Privolzhsk Railway – 4,237 km (managed from Saratov)
 Kuybyshev Railway – 4,752 km (managed from Samara)
 Sverdlovsk Railway – 7,154 km (managed from Yekaterinburg)
 South Urals Railways – 4,807 km (managed from Chelyabinsk)
 West Siberian Railway – 5,558 km (managed from Novosibirsk)
 Krasnoyarsk Railways – 3,158 km (managed from Krasnoyarsk)
 East Siberian Railway – 3,876 km (managed from Irkutsk)
 Zabaikal Railway – 3,336 km (managed from Chita)
 Far Eastern Railway – 5,991 km (managed from Khabarovsk)

:
 Abkhazian Railway: 10-year lease starting from 2009.

 South Caucasus Railway: 30-year concession starting 2008.

RZD also manages a 50% share in Ulaanbaatar Railways on behalf of the Russian government.

Rolling stock

Traction rolling stock includes diesel locomotives, electric locomotives, electric trains, diesel trains, railcars, railway handcar, other self-propelled equipment and non-tractive rolling stock – different cars (passenger, freight) and a special rolling stock.

The main producer of passenger cars (95%) is Tver Carriage Works.

At the end of 2012, the rolling stock inventory included 20,618 locomotives, including 2,543 electric passenger locomotives, 578 diesel passenger locomotives, 7,837 electric freight locomotives, 3,556 diesel freight locomotives, 6,104 shunting locomotives.

In 2017 RZD purchased 459 locomotives, including four EP1M, 13 EP2K, 19 TEP70BS and four EP20 passenger units, as well as 84 2ES6, 10 2ES10, 51 2ES5K, 45 3ES5K, four 3ES4K, 86 2TE25KM, and five 4ES5K freight units.

In 2013, the RZD holding owned 252,900 freight cars, including 54,200 owned directly by Russian Railways, with the rest owned by company subsidiaries and affiliates, such as Federal Freight and TransContainer.

Performance indicators
Annually JSC Russian Railways carries over 1 billion passengers and 1 billion tons of freight.

In 2011, freight traffic of Russian Railways totaled about 1.4 billion tons. Passenger traffic for the year 2011 reached 992.4 million people.

The average salary on the network in October 2011 – 31 thousand rubles a month. Loading volume for the year 2012 amounted to 1 billion 274.7 million tons (+2.7% compared to 2011), the share in the total turnover of the country (except pipelines) — 85.5%. In 2012, the network carried 1 bln 56.7 million passengers (+6.4% compared to 2011). Net income from the basic activities using Russian GAAP was in 2012 almost 5.3 billion rubles, which is a decrease compared to 2011 (13.7 billion rubles) of almost 3 times.

In total, Russian Railways receives 112 billion roubles (around US$1.5 billion) annually from the government.

See also
Russian Railway Museum, in Saint Petersburg
 Emperor railway station in Pushkin town

References

Further reading
 Collins, D. N. "The Franco-Russian Alliance and Russian Railways, 1891–1914." Historical Journal 16, no. 4 (1973): 777-88. online.
 Haywood, Richard M. "The question of a standard gauge for Russian railways, 1836–1860." Slavic Review 28.1 (1969): 72-80 online.
 Starns, Karl Edward McDaniel. "The Russian Railways and Imperial Intersections in the Russian Empire." (Diss. 2013). online
 Westwood, John Norton. A history of Russian railways (G. Allen and Unwin, 1964).
 Westwood, J. Soviet railways to Russian railways (Springer, 2001).

In Russian
Госкомстат СССР (Gov't Statistical Committee ) "Народное хозяйство СССР: статистический ежегодник" (The national economy of the USSR, statistical yearbook),Финансы и статистика, Москва (various years till 1990).
Госкомстат СССР (Уманский, Л.), "Народное хозяйство СССР за 70 лет: юбилейный статистический ежегодник". Москва,  "Финансы и статистика", 1987.
Госкомстат СССР "Транспорт и связь СССР: Статистический сборник" (USSR Transportation and Communications: statistics). Москва. 1990 (and other editions: 1967, 1972, etc.)
ЖТ = Железнодорожный Транспорт (Railroad Transportation) a monthly magazine published since 1826.  The month designation is numeric; e.g. 10-1998 is the November issue.
Плакс, А.В. & Пупынин, В.Н., "Электрические железные дороги" (Electric Railroads), Москва, "Транспорт", 1993. 
Резер, С.М., "Взаимодействие транспортных систем", Москва, "Наука", 1985.
Шадур, Л.А. ed., "Вагоны: конструкция, теория и расчёт" (Railroad cars: construction, theory and calculations), Москва, "Транспорт", 1980.
Федеральная служба государственной статистики (Federal government statistical service) "Транспорт в России" (Transportation in Russia) (annual) Available online
Филиппов, М.М. (editor), "Железные дороги. Общий курс" (Railroads, General Course) Москва, Транспорт, 3rd ed. 1981.  4th ed. 1991 with new editor: Уздин, М.М.
Шафиркин, Б.И, "Единая транспортная система СССР и взаимодействие различных видов транспорта" (Unified Transportation System of the USSR and interaction of various modes of transportation), Москва, "Высшая школа", 1983.
Шадур. Л. А. (ed.), "Вагоны" (Railway cars), Moscow, "Транспорт", 1980.

External links

 Russian Railways Official Site 
 
 Financial Information

 
1992 establishments in Russia
Companies based in Moscow
Government-owned companies of Russia
Government-owned railway companies
Railway companies established in 2003
Railway companies of Russia
Russian brands
Russian entities subject to the U.S. Department of the Treasury sanctions